Riccia atlantica is a species of liverwort in the family Ricciaceae. It is endemic to the Madeira archipelago and the Savage Islands in Portugal.  Its natural habitat is rocky shores.

References 

Flora of Madeira
Flora of the Savage Islands
Ricciaceae
Vulnerable plants
Taxonomy articles created by Polbot